Schwarzer may refer to:

Trollinger, a German/Italian wine grape variety
St. Laurent (grape), a red wine grape variety

Persons with the surname
 Alice Schwarzer (born 1942), German feminist
 Christian Schwarzer (born 1962), German handballer
 Johann Schwarzer (1880–1914), Austrian photographer and film producer
 Mark Schwarzer (born 1972), Australian footballer
 Mitchell Schwarzer, American architectural historian
 William Schwarzer (1925–2017), American judge
 Zbigniew Schwarzer, Polish rower

See also 
 Schwarz (disambiguation) 
 Schwartz (disambiguation)